Varsha Priyadarshini (born 7 August 1984) is an Indian actress, predominantly featured in Odia and Bengali films.

She also carries out social work through her institution SAMMANITA, which works towards providing education of destitute children and towards women empowerment.

Filmography

References

External links
 

Living people
Actresses from Bhubaneswar
Indian film actresses
Actresses in Odia cinema
Actresses in Bengali cinema
21st-century Indian actresses
1984 births
Ollywood